Thomas Aubrey (1808–1867) was a Welsh Wesleyan Methodist minister.

Early life
Aubrey was born at Cefn-coed-y-cymmer on 13 May 1808. His parents were Thomas and Anne Aubrey of Cefn-coed-y-cymmer. He was schooled on the Arminianism, within the context of the Wesleyan faith, by an elder and at about the age of 14, when he had a religious conversion. By the age of 15, he was preaching and became a Wesleyan Methodist minister by 1826 and ordained a full-time minister in 1830.  He married Elizabeth Williams of Ruthin on 6 April 1831.

Career
Beginning in 1826, he preached in London, Liverpool, on circuits in North Wales, and in Merthyr Tydfil for 39 years. He was the chairman of the North Wales district meeting for eleven years beginning in 1854.  Within four years, he had become the superintendent minister of the Bangor circuit, where he ran a series of successful revival meetings and "sparked" a revival movement in Wales. In 1865, he became a supernumerary.

According to biographer Albert Hughes Williams, he was "one of the outstanding figures in Welsh Wesleyan Methodist history", excelling as an administrator and an orator. He was instrumental in the creation of the North Wales District Chapel Fund and the home mission fund. He established revival meetings, circuit manses, and meetings within churches to discuss their spiritual condition.

He died 16 November 1867 at Rhyl.

Notes and references 

1808 births
1867 deaths
Arminian ministers
Methodist ministers
Welsh Protestant religious leaders